Connect Transit, formerly Bloomington-Normal Public Transit System until 2012, is the primary provider of mass transportation in Bloomington/Normal, IL. The system consists of 13 fixed routes, plus the Illinois State University Redbird Express, and two additional Express routes that operate on the busiest portions of the Lime and Red routes.

History 
Until 1972, Bloomington-Normal was served by National City Lines. When the company left the region, the City of Bloomington and Town of Normal established an intergovernmental agency known as the Bloomington Normal Public Transit System, via intergovernmental agreement. The transit system operates as an independent agency governed by a board appointed by both the City of Bloomington and Town of Normal.

Routes 
Connect Transit's buses run every 15, 30, or 60 minutes, depending on the route, time of day, and day of the week. Service is offered in the day and evening hours daily, although hours are reduced on weekends. Buses do not operate on New Year's Day, Memorial Day, Independence Day, Labor Day, Thanksgiving, or Christmas. Basic adult fare is $1.25 with free transfers. 1, 7, or 30 day bus passes are available.

Connect Transit has two main transfer centers. Uptown Station, located in Normal, is also served by Amtrak and by intercity buses. Eight routes have one terminus here. The other transfer center is two miles to the south, in downtown Bloomington. Nine routes have one terminus here. The Green, Red, and Lime routes serve both locations.

The Olive route that ran along Normal's north side was eliminated on July 1, 2019, due to low ridership.

Route List

Fleet

Transit

Demand Response

Fixed Route Ridership

The ridership statistics shown here are of fixed route services only and do not include demand response.

References

External links 

 

Bus transportation in Illinois
Bloomington–Normal
Transit agencies in Illinois